Cheick Touré (born 7 February 2001) is a Dutch professional footballer who plays as a winger.

Career
On 22 June 2020, PSV announced that they had signed Touré on a two-year contract that would run until 2022. He was assigned to the reserve team for the 2020–21 season, competing in the second-tier Eerste Divisie. In January of 2023 Touré signed with the MLS Next Pro team Austin FC II.

Career statistics

References

External links
 

Living people
2001 births
Footballers from Dordrecht
Association football forwards
Dutch footballers
FC Dordrecht players
Feyenoord players
Jong PSV players
Eredivisie players
Eerste Divisie players
Dutch people of Guinean descent